Çandır, Serik is a township in the District of Serik, Antalya Province, Turkey.

References

Populated places in Antalya Province
Serik District
Towns in Turkey